Costantino de Castro was a bishop of Bosa, in Sardinia, Italy.

In 1073 the Diocese of Bosa entered its golden age under Costantino, when Pope Gregory VII appointed him Metropolitan of Torres.

The Cathedral of St. Peter at Bosa was built while Costantino served as bishop there.

External links
http://www.newadvent.org/cathen/02689b.htm

Bishops in Sardinia
11th-century Italian Roman Catholic bishops